Veltheimia is a genus  of perennial plants native to the Cape Provinces of South Africa in the family Asparagaceae, subfamily Scilloideae. It was named in honour of August Ferdinand von Veltheim (1741–1801), a German patron of botany.

There are two accepted species:

Veltheimia bracteata  Harv. ex Baker  
Veltheimia capensis (L.) DC.

References 

Scilloideae
Flora of the Cape Provinces
Asparagaceae genera